Cooking, cookery, or culinary arts is the art, science and craft of using heat to prepare food for consumption. Cooking techniques and ingredients vary widely, from grilling food over an open fire to using electric stoves, to baking in various types of ovens, reflecting local conditions.

Types of cooking also depend on the skill levels and training of the cooks. Cooking is done both by people in their own dwellings and by professional cooks and chefs in restaurants and other food establishments.

Preparing food with heat or fire is an activity unique to humans. Archeological evidence of cooking fires from at least 300,000 years ago exists, but some estimate that humans started cooking up to 2 million years ago.

The expansion of agriculture, commerce, trade, and transportation between civilizations in different regions offered cooks many new ingredients. New inventions and technologies, such as the invention of pottery for holding and boiling of water, expanded cooking techniques. Some modern cooks apply advanced scientific techniques to food preparation to further enhance the flavor of the dish served.

History
Phylogenetic analysis suggests that early hominids may have adopted cooking 1.8 million to 2.3 million years ago. Re-analysis of burnt bone fragments and plant ashes from the Wonderwerk Cave in South Africa has provided evidence supporting control of fire by early humans by 1 million years ago. In his seminal work Catching Fire: How Cooking Made Us Human, Richard Wrangham suggested that evolution of bipedalism and a large cranial capacity meant that early Homo erectus regularly cooked food. However, unequivocal evidence in the archaeological record for the controlled use of fire begins at 400,000 BCE, long after Homo erectus. Archaeological evidence from 300,000 years ago, in the form of ancient hearths, earth ovens, burnt animal bones, and flint, are found across Europe and the Middle East. The oldest likely evidence (via heated fish teeth from a deep cave) of controlled use of fire to cook food by archaic humans was dated to ~780,000 years ago. Anthropologists think that widespread cooking fires began about 250,000 years ago when hearths first appeared.

Recently, the earliest hearths have been reported to be at least 790,000 years old.

Communication between the Old World and the New World in the Columbian Exchange influenced the history of cooking. The movement of foods across the Atlantic from the New World, such as potatoes, tomatoes, maize, beans, bell pepper, chili pepper, vanilla, pumpkin, cassava, avocado, peanut, pecan, cashew, pineapple, blueberry, sunflower, chocolate, gourds, and squash, had a profound effect on Old World cooking. The movement of foods across the Atlantic from the Old World, such as cattle, sheep, pigs, wheat, oats, barley, rice, apples, pears, peas, chickpeas, green beans, mustard, and carrots, similarly changed New World cooking.

In the seventeenth and eighteenth centuries, food was a classic marker of identity in Europe. In the nineteenth-century "Age of Nationalism" cuisine became a defining symbol of national identity.

The Industrial Revolution brought mass-production, mass-marketing, and standardization of food. Factories processed, preserved, canned, and packaged a wide variety of foods, and processed cereals quickly became a defining feature of the American breakfast. In the 1920s, freezing methods, cafeterias, and fast food restaurants emerged.

Ingredients

Most ingredients in cooking are derived from living organisms. Vegetables, fruits, grains and nuts as well as herbs and spices come from plants, while meat, eggs, and dairy products come from animals. Mushrooms and the yeast used in baking are kinds of fungi. Cooks also use water and minerals such as salt. Cooks can also use wine or spirits.

Naturally occurring ingredients contain various amounts of molecules called proteins, carbohydrates and fats. They also contain water and minerals. Cooking involves a manipulation of the chemical properties of these molecules.

Carbohydrates

Carbohydrates include the common sugar, sucrose (table sugar), a disaccharide, and such simple sugars as glucose (made by enzymatic splitting of sucrose) and fructose (from fruit), and starches from sources such as cereal flour, rice, arrowroot and potato.

The interaction of heat and carbohydrate is complex. Long-chain sugars such as starch tend to break down into more digestible simpler sugars. If the sugars are heated so that all water of crystallisation is driven off, caramelization starts, with the sugar undergoing thermal decomposition with the formation of carbon, and other breakdown products producing caramel. Similarly, the heating of sugars and proteins causes the Maillard reaction, a basic flavor-enhancing technique.

An emulsion of starch with fat or water can, when gently heated, provide thickening to the dish being cooked. In European cooking, a mixture of butter and flour called a roux is used to thicken liquids to make stews or sauces. In Asian cooking, a similar effect is obtained from a mixture of rice or corn starch and water. These techniques rely on the properties of starches to create simpler mucilaginous saccharides during cooking, which causes the familiar thickening of sauces. This thickening will break down, however, under additional heat.

Fats

Types of fat include vegetable oils, animal products such as butter and lard, as well as fats from grains, including maize and flax oils. Fats are used in a number of ways in cooking and baking. To prepare stir fries, grilled cheese or pancakes, the pan or griddle is often coated with fat or oil. Fats are also used as an ingredient in baked goods such as cookies, cakes and pies. Fats can reach temperatures higher than the boiling point of water, and are often used to conduct high heat to other ingredients, such as in frying, deep frying or sautéing. Fats are used to add flavor to food (e.g., butter or bacon fat), prevent food from sticking to pans and create a desirable texture.

Proteins

Edible animal material, including muscle, offal, milk, eggs and egg whites, contains substantial amounts of protein. Almost all vegetable matter (in particular legumes and seeds) also includes proteins, although generally in smaller amounts. Mushrooms have high protein content. Any of these may be sources of essential amino acids. When proteins are heated they become denatured (unfolded) and change texture. In many cases, this causes the structure of the material to become softer or more friable – meat becomes cooked and is more friable and less flexible. In some cases, proteins can form more rigid structures, such as the coagulation of albumen in egg whites. The formation of a relatively rigid but flexible matrix from egg white provides an important component in baking cakes, and also underpins many desserts based on meringue.

Water

Cooking often involves water and water-based liquids. These can be added in order to immerse the substances being cooked (this is typically done with water, stock or wine). Alternatively, the foods themselves can release water. A favorite method of adding flavor to dishes is to save the liquid for use in other recipes.  Liquids are so important to cooking that the name of the cooking method used is often based on how the liquid is combined with the food, as in steaming, simmering, boiling, braising and blanching. Heating liquid in an open container results in rapidly increased evaporation, which concentrates the remaining flavor and ingredients – this is a critical component of both stewing and sauce making.

Vitamins and minerals

Vitamins and minerals are required for normal metabolism; and what the body cannot manufacture itself must come from external sources. Vitamins come from several sources including fresh fruit and vegetables (Vitamin C), carrots, liver (Vitamin A), cereal bran, bread, liver (B vitamins), fish liver oil (Vitamin D) and fresh green vegetables (Vitamin K). Many minerals are also essential in small quantities including iron, calcium, magnesium, sodium chloride and sulfur; and in very small quantities copper, zinc and selenium. The micronutrients, minerals, and vitamins in fruit and vegetables may be destroyed or eluted by cooking. Vitamin C is especially prone to oxidation during cooking and may be completely destroyed by protracted cooking. The bioavailability of some vitamins such as thiamin, vitamin B6, niacin, folate, and carotenoids are increased with cooking by being freed from the food microstructure. Blanching or steaming vegetables is a way of minimizing vitamin and mineral loss in cooking.

Methods

There are many methods of cooking, most of which have been known since antiquity. These include baking, roasting, frying, grilling, barbecuing, smoking, boiling, steaming and braising. A more recent innovation is microwaving. Various methods use differing levels of heat and moisture and vary in cooking time. The method chosen greatly affects the result because some foods are more appropriate to some methods than others. Some major hot cooking techniques include:

Roasting
Roasting – Barbecuing – Grilling/Broiling – Rotisserie – Searing
Baking
Baking – Baking Blind – Flashbaking
Boiling
Boiling – Blanching – Braising – Coddling – Double steaming – Infusion – Poaching – Pressure cooking – Simmering – Smothering – Steaming – Steeping – Stewing – Stone boiling –  Vacuum flask cooking
Frying
Fry – Air frying — Deep frying – Gentle frying - Hot salt frying – Hot sand frying – Pan frying – Pressure frying – Sautéing  – Shallow frying – Stir frying — Vacuum frying
Steaming
Steaming works by boiling water continuously, causing it to vaporise into steam; the steam then carries heat to the nearby food, thus cooking the food.  By many it is considered a healthy form of cooking, holding nutrients within the vegetable or meat being cooked.
 En papillote – The food is put into a pouch and then baked, allowing its own moisture to steam the food.
Smoking
Smoking is the process of flavoring, cooking, or preserving food by exposing it to smoke from burning or smoldering material, most often wood.

Health and safety

Indoor air pollution 

As of 2021, over 2.6 billion people cook using open fires or inefficient stoves using kerosene, biomass, and coal as fuel. These cooking practices use fuels and technologies that produce high levels of household air pollution, causing 3.8 million premature deaths annually. Of these deaths, 27% are from pneumonia, 27% from ischaemic heart disease, 20% from chronic obstructive pulmonary disease, 18% from stroke, and 8% from lung cancer. Women and young children are disproportionately affected, since they spend the most time near the hearth.

Security while cooking 
Hazards while cooking can include

 Unseen slippery surfaces (such as from oil stains or water droplets)
 Cuts (1 percent of injuries in United States related to knives, ended in hospital admissions. In overall 400 000 injuries from knives are recorded in the US
 Burns or fires

To prevent those injuries there are protections such as cooking clothing, anti-slip shoes, fire extinguisher and more.

Food safety

Cooking can prevent many foodborne illnesses that would otherwise occur if the food is eaten raw. When heat is used in the preparation of food, it can kill or inactivate harmful organisms, such as bacteria and viruses, as well as various parasites such as tapeworms and Toxoplasma gondii. Food poisoning and other illness from uncooked or poorly prepared food may be caused by bacteria such as pathogenic strains of Escherichia coli, Salmonella typhimurium and Campylobacter, viruses such as noroviruses, and protozoa such as Entamoeba histolytica. Bacteria, viruses and parasites may be introduced through salad, meat that is uncooked or done rare, and unboiled water.

The sterilizing effect of cooking depends on temperature, cooking time, and technique used. Some food spoilage bacteria such as Clostridium botulinum or Bacillus cereus can form spores that survive boiling, which then germinate and regrow after the food has cooled. This makes it unsafe to reheat cooked food more than once.

Cooking increases the digestibility of many foods which are inedible or poisonous when raw.

Food safety depends on the safe preparation, handling, and storage of food. Washing of hands and surfaces, especially when handling different meats, and keeping raw food separate from cooked food to avoid cross-contamination, are good practices in food preparation. Foods prepared on plastic cutting boards may be less likely to harbor bacteria than wooden ones. Washing and disinfecting cutting boards, especially after use with raw meat, poultry, or seafood, reduces the risk of contamination.

Effects on nutritional content of food

Proponents of raw foodism argue that cooking food increases the risk of some of the detrimental effects on food or health. They point out that during cooking of vegetables and fruit containing vitamin C, the vitamin elutes into the cooking water and becomes degraded through oxidation. Peeling vegetables can also substantially reduce the vitamin C content, especially in the case of potatoes where most vitamin C is in the skin. However, research has shown that in the specific case of carotenoids a greater proportion is absorbed from cooked vegetables than from raw vegetables.

German research in 2003 showed significant benefits in reducing breast cancer risk when large amounts of raw vegetable matter are included in the diet. The authors attribute some of this effect to heat-labile phytonutrients. Sulforaphane, a glucosinolate breakdown product, which may be found in vegetables such as broccoli, has been shown to be protective against prostate cancer; however, much of it is destroyed when the vegetable is boiled.  Although there has been some basic research on how sulforaphane might exert beneficial effects in vivo, there is no high-quality evidence for its efficacy against human diseases.

The USDA has studied retention data for 16 vitamins, 8 minerals, and alcohol for approximately 290 foods for various cooking methods.

Carcinogens

In a human epidemiological analysis by Richard Doll and Richard Peto in 1981, diet was estimated to cause a large percentage of cancers. Studies suggest that around 32% of cancer deaths may be avoidable by changes to the diet. Some of these cancers may be caused by carcinogens in food generated during the cooking process, although it is often difficult to identify the specific components in diet that serve to increase cancer risk. Many foods, such as beefsteak and broccoli, contain low concentrations of both carcinogens and anticarcinogens.

Several studies published since 1990 indicate that cooking meat at high temperature creates heterocyclic amines (HCAs), which are thought to increase cancer risk in humans. Researchers at the National Cancer Institute found that human subjects who ate beef rare or medium-rare had less than one third the risk of stomach cancer than those who ate beef medium-well or well-done. While avoiding meat or eating meat raw may be the only ways to avoid HCAs in meat fully, the National Cancer Institute states that cooking meat below  creates "negligible amounts" of HCAs. Also, microwaving meat before cooking may reduce HCAs by 90% by reducing the time needed for the meat to be cooked at high heat. Nitrosamines are found in some food, and may be produced by some cooking processes from proteins or from nitrites used as food preservatives; cured meat such as bacon has been found to be carcinogenic, with links to colon cancer. Ascorbate, which is added to cured meat, however, reduces nitrosamine formation.

Baking, grilling or broiling food, especially starchy foods, until a toasted crust is formed generates significant concentrations of acrylamide. This discovery in 2002 led to international health concerns. Subsequent research has however found that it is not likely that the acrylamides in burnt or well-cooked food cause cancer in humans; Cancer Research UK categorizes the idea that burnt food causes cancer as a "myth".

Other health issues
Cooking dairy products may reduce a protective effect against colon cancer. Researchers at the University of Toronto suggest that ingesting uncooked or unpasteurized dairy products (see also Raw milk) may reduce the risk of colorectal cancer. Mice and rats fed uncooked sucrose, casein, and beef tallow had one-third to one-fifth the incidence of microadenomas as the mice and rats fed the same ingredients cooked. This claim, however, is contentious. According to the Food and Drug Administration of the United States, health benefits claimed by raw milk advocates do not exist. "The small quantities of antibodies in milk are not absorbed in the human intestinal tract," says Barbara Ingham, PhD, associate professor and extension food scientist at the University of Wisconsin-Madison. "There is no scientific evidence that raw milk contains an anti-arthritis factor or that it enhances resistance to other diseases."

Heating sugars with proteins or fats can produce advanced glycation end products ("glycotoxins").

Deep fried food in restaurants may contain high level of trans fat, which is known to increase levels of low-density lipoprotein that in turn may increase risk of heart diseases and other conditions. However, many fast food chains have now switched to trans-fat-free alternatives for deep-frying.

Scientific aspects

The scientific study of cooking has become known as molecular gastronomy. This is a subdiscipline of food science concerning the physical and chemical transformations that occur during cooking.

Important contributions have been made by scientists, chefs and authors such as Hervé This (chemist), Nicholas Kurti (physicist), Peter Barham (physicist), Harold McGee (author), Shirley Corriher (biochemist, author),  Robert Wolke (chemist, author.) It is different for the application of scientific knowledge to cooking, that is "molecular cooking"( (for the technique) or "molecular cuisine" (for a culinary style), for which chefs such as Raymond Blanc, Philippe and Christian Conticini, Ferran Adria, Heston Blumenthal, Pierre Gagnaire (chef).

Chemical processes central to cooking include hydrolysis (in particular beta elimination of pectins, during the thermal treatment of plant tissues), pyrolysis, and glycation reactions wrongly named Maillard reactions.

Cooking foods with heat depends on many factors — the specific heat of an object, thermal conductivity, and perhaps most significantly the difference in temperature between the two objects. Thermal diffusivity is the combination of specific heat, conductivity and density that determines how long it will take for the food to reach a certain temperature.

Home-cooking and commercial cooking

Home cooking has traditionally been a process carried out informally in a home or around a communal fire, and can be enjoyed by all members of the family, although in many cultures women bear primary responsibility. Cooking is also often carried out outside of personal quarters, for example at restaurants, or schools. Bakeries were one of the earliest forms of cooking outside the home, and bakeries in the past often offered the cooking of pots of food provided by their customers as an additional service. In the present day, factory food preparation has become common, with many "ready-to-eat" as well as "ready-to-cook" foods being prepared and cooked in factories and home cooks using a mixture of scratch made, and factory made foods together to make a meal. The nutritional value of including more commercially prepared foods has been found to be inferior to home-made foods. Home-cooked meals tend to be healthier with fewer calories, and less saturated fat, cholesterol and sodium on a per calorie basis while providing more fiber, calcium, and iron. The ingredients are also directly sourced, so there is control over authenticity, taste, and nutritional value. The superior nutritional quality of home-cooking could therefore play a role in preventing chronic disease. Cohort studies following the elderly over 10 years show that adults who cook their own meals have significantly lower mortality, even when controlling for confounding variables.

"Home-cooking" may be associated with comfort food, and some commercially produced foods and restaurant meals are presented through advertising or packaging as having been "home-cooked", regardless of their actual origin. This trend began in the 1920s and is attributed to people in urban areas of the U.S. wanting homestyle food even though their schedules and smaller kitchens made cooking harder.

See also

 Carryover cooking
 Control of fire by early humans
 Cookbook
 Cooker
 Cooking weights and measures
 Cuisine
 Culinary arts
 Culinary profession
 Cooking school
 Dishwashing
 Food and cooking hygiene
 Food industry
 Food preservation
 Food writing
 Foodpairing
 Gourmet Museum and Library
 High altitude cooking
 International food terms
 List of cooking appliances
 List of cooking techniques
 List of cuisines
 List of films about cooking
 List of food preparation utensils
 List of ovens
 List of stoves
 Nutrition
 Recipe
 Scented water
 Spices
 Staple (cooking)

References

External links

 
Articles containing video clips
Home economics
Survival skills